No. 662 Squadron AAC is a squadron of the British Army's Army Air Corps (AAC) which flies the AgustaWestland Apache AH.1 from Wattisham Airfield as part of 3 Regiment Army Air Corps.

History

662 Air Observation Sqn RAF was formed on 30 September 1943, manned by Royal Artillery pilots and RAF crewmen. The squadron was active in the European Theatre of Operations throughout 1944, flying MK3 Austers to conduct counter battery registration and aerial photography tasks.

The squadron remained in Germany in the immediate aftermath of the war and was disbanded there in December 1945. It subsequently reformed as a Royal Auxiliary Air Force unit in Colerne, Wiltshire, before disbanding again in March 1967. 

On 1 November 1971 the squadron reformed in West Germany as part of 3AAC, located in Soest.

The squadron is currently stationed at Wattisham Airfield, Suffolk, where it operates Apache AH.1 attack helicopters, in support of 3(UK) Division.

See also

 List of Army Air Corps aircraft units

References

Citations

Bibliography

Army Air Corps aircraft squadrons